Kristian Mosegaard (3 December 1930 – 20 March 2014) was a Danish footballer. He played in two matches for the Denmark national football team in 1957.

References

External links
 

1930 births
2014 deaths
Danish men's footballers
Denmark international footballers
Place of birth missing
Association footballers not categorized by position